Alfie Bridgman (born 11 April 2004) is a professional footballer who plays as a midfielder for Bognor Regis Town on loan from Portsmouth. Born in England, he represents Malta at youth international level.

Club career

Portsmouth

On 12 January 2021, Bridgman made his Pompey debut, coming on as a sub in a 5–1 defeat at Peterborough United in the EFL Trophy.

On 22 March 2022, Bridgman joined Bognor Regis Town on loan.

On 2 May 2022, it was announced that Bridgman had signed a third year scholarship deal with Portsmouth after his 'good spell' with Bognor Regis Town.

In August 2022, Bridgman returned on loan to Bognor Regis Town.

International career
In June 2022, Bridgman was called up to the Malta under-19 squad for the first time.

Career statistics

Personal life
Bridgman is of Maltese descent with his grandmother having been born in the country. He attended Purbrook Park School growing up. His older brother Stanley also played for Portsmouth before having a spell playing in Finland for Pallo-Iirot.

References

External links

2004 births
Living people
English footballers
Association football midfielders
Portsmouth F.C. players
Footballers from Portsmouth
English people of Maltese descent
Malta youth international footballers
Bognor Regis Town F.C. players
Isthmian League players